Martin Krizic (born 29 December 2003) is an Austrian footballer currently playing as a midfielder for Dornbirn.

Career statistics

Club

Notes

References

2003 births
Living people
Austrian footballers
Association football midfielders
2. Liga (Austria) players